Timia is a small town and commune in northern Niger, situated at an oasis in the Aïr Mountains, Agadez Region, Arlit Department.  Visitors come to the Tuareg town to see a seasonal waterfall, a former French fort and the nearby ruined town of Assodé. As of 2011, the commune had a total population of 13,588 people.

Timia lies south of Iferouane and north of Agadez.  The main town lies around 3 km from a stone guelta oasis, which holds water year round.  It is also known for its fruit trees, an unusual sight in the Saharan regions of northern Niger.

Gallery

References

Oases of Niger
Tuareg
Agadez Region
Communes of Niger